Independência is a municipality of the Northeastern state of Ceará in Brazil. It is the fourth largest by area in that state.

References 

Municipalities in Ceará